Polygonatum , also known as King Solomon's-seal or Solomon's seal, is a genus of flowering plants. In the APG III classification system, it is placed in the family Asparagaceae, subfamily Nolinoideae (formerly the family Ruscaceae). It has also been classified in the former family Convallariaceae and, like many lilioid monocots, was formerly classified in the lily family, Liliaceae.  The genus is distributed throughout the temperate Northern Hemisphere. Most of the approximately 63 species occur in Asia, with 20 endemic to China.

Etymology
Polygonatum comes from the ancient Greek for "many knees", referring to the multiple jointed rhizome. One explanation for the derivation of the common name "Solomon's seal" is that the roots bear depressions which resemble royal seals. Another is that the cut roots resemble Hebrew characters.

Description
The fruits are red or black berries.

Taxonomy

Species
The following species are recognised in the genus Polygonatum:

Polygonatum acuminatifolium 
Polygonatum adnatum 
Polygonatum amabile 
Polygonatum angelicum 
Polygonatum annamense 
Polygonatum arisanense 
Polygonatum autumnale 
Polygonatum × azegamii 
Polygonatum biflorum  (including Polygonatum commutatum) – Solomon's seal, smooth or great Solomon's seal – Eastern and central North America
Polygonatum brevistylum 
Polygonatum × buschianum 
Polygonatum campanulatum 
Polygonatum cathcartii 
Polygonatum cirrhifolium  – tendril-leaf Solomon's seal – Southern China
Polygonatum costatum 
Polygonatum cryptanthum 
Polygonatum curvistylum 
Polygonatum cyrtonema  – Solomon's seal – Eastern Asia
Polygonatum daminense 
Polygonatum × desoulavyi 
Polygonatum × domonense 
Polygonatum falcatum  – Eastern Asia
Polygonatum filipes 
Polygonatum franchetii 
Polygonatum geminiflorum 
Polygonatum glaberrimum 
Polygonatum gongshanense 
Polygonatum govanianum 
Polygonatum graminifolium 
Polygonatum grandicaule 
Polygonatum griffithii 
Polygonatum hirtellum 
Polygonatum hookeri 
Polygonatum humile  – dwarf Solomon's seal – Eastern Asia
Polygonatum × hybridum  – garden Solomon's seal – Europe
Polygonatum inflatum  – Eastern Asia
Polygonatum infundiflorum 
Polygonatum involucratum  – Asia
Polygonatum jinzhaiense 
Polygonatum kingianum  – Solomon's seal – Asia
Polygonatum × krylovii 
Polygonatum lasianthum  – Korean Solomon's seal – Eastern Asia
Polygonatum latifolium 
Polygonatum leiboense 
Polygonatum longistylum 
Polygonatum luteoverrucosum 
Polygonatum macranthum 
Polygonatum macropodum  – big footed Solomon's seal – Asia
Polygonatum megaphyllum 
Polygonatum mengtzense 
Polygonatum multiflorum  – (common) Solomon's seal – Europe
Polygonatum nervulosum 
Polygonatum nodosum 
Polygonatum odoratum  – scented (or angular) Solomon's seal – Europe
Polygonatum omeiense 
Polygonatum oppositifolium 
Polygonatum orientale  – oriental Solomon's seal – Western Asia, Eastern Europe
Polygonatum prattii 
Polygonatum × pseudopolyanthemum 
Polygonatum pubescens  – downy/hairy Solomon's seal – Eastern North America
Polygonatum punctatum 
Polygonatum qinghaiense 
Polygonatum robustum 
Polygonatum roseum 
Polygonatum sewerzowii 
Polygonatum sibiricum  – Huang Jing, Siberian Solomon's seal – Eastern Asia
Polygonatum singalilense 
Polygonatum sparsifolium 
Polygonatum stenophyllum 
Polygonatum stewartianum 
Polygonatum × tamaense 
Polygonatum tessellatum 
Polygonatum tsinlingense 
Polygonatum undulatifolium 
Polygonatum urceolatum 
Polygonatum verticillatum  – whorled Solomon's seal – Europe
Polygonatum wardii 
Polygonatum yunnanense 
Polygonatum zanlanscianense 
Polygonatum zhejiangensis

Uses

Gardening
Several species are valued as ornamental plants, including:
 
 Polygonatum biflorum
 Polygonatum hirtum Polygonatum hookeri Polygonatum humile Polygonatum × hybridumPolygonatum multiflorumPolygonatum odoratumPolygonatum stewartianumPolygonatum verticillatumFood
Many species have long been used as food in China, such as Polygonatum sibiricum. Leaves, stems, and rhizomes are used raw or cooked and served as a side dish with meat and rice. The rhizomes of two local species are eaten with chicken's or pig's feet during festivals. The rhizomes are used to make tea or soaked in wine or liquor to flavor the beverages. They are also fried with sugar and honey to make sweet snacks. The starchy rhizomes can be dried, ground, and added to flour to supplement food staples. The rhizome of P. sibiricum is pulped, boiled, strained, and thickened with barley flour to make a sweet liquid seasoning agent called tangxi. At times, people in China have relied on P. megaphyllum as a famine food.

The shoots of some Polygonatum can be boiled and used like asparagus. P. cirrifolium and P. verticillatum are used as leafy vegetables in India. The American species P. biflorum has a starchy root that was eaten like the potato and used as flour for bread.P. sibiricum is used for a tea called dungulle in Korea.

 Traditional medicine 

The traditional use of Polygonatum in the treatment of diabetes was first observed in 1930 by Hedwig Langecker. After experiments, she concluded that it was effective in fighting nutritional hyperglycemia, though not that caused by adrenaline release, probably due to its glucokinin content.P. verticillatum is used in Ayurveda as an aphrodisiac. It is also used to treat pain, fever, inflammation, allergy, and weakness.

An herbal remedy called rhizoma polygonati is a mix of Polygonatum species used in traditional Chinese medicine. It is supposed to strengthen various organs and enhance the qi. Polygonatum is believed to be restorative to mental vitality, especially when the mind has been overworked, overstressed, or is in a state of exhaustion.

See also
 Maianthemum''

References

 
Asparagaceae genera
Edible plants
Medicinal plants
Dietary supplements
Taxa named by Philip Miller